The Jungle King (also known as: Enchanted Tales: The Jungle King) is a 1994 American animated musical film that was made by Golden Books' film studio, Golden Films and distributed by Sony Wonder. Diane Eskenazi, who is the founder of Golden Films, was the producer, director and storywriter for the film as she did the same for other animated films made by this studio. It was originally released on VHS in 1994, but it later did see a DVD release in 2003. This animated feature was released in Golden Films' Enchanted Tales collection of films. The style of the film is reminiscent to the cartoons and animated films of the 1970s.

Plot
Taking place in the continent between Africa and Asia, the film is about an anthropomorphic lion named King Maximilian III, a grumpy, selfish and obnoxious king who rules the main part of the continent in an unpopular monarchy. He constantly makes preposterous laws and oppresses his subjects, though he is oblivious to how much he is hated by the angry animal citizens, due to how his main servants, the hyena Chancellor (with his beautiful parrot assistant, Ricardo) and gorilla General Glump, constantly flatter and cajole towards him. Meanwhile, Max's twin brother, Irwin, who is kind and friendly, enjoys his life illustrating birds, including his pet bird, Daphne.

One day, Max falls in love with a young lioness named Leonette and demands to marry her, despite the fact that she hates him as much as anyone-else, even though the rest of her family love the king and support the idea of her marriage to him. Unfortunately, the Chancellor is also in love with her and plots to take the throne. To this end, he has been doing covert work in another part of the continent that is ruled by Emperor Raj, a tiger king who rules less land than Max. They plot to remove King Max and attack his army while they are leaderless. As a result, the Chancellor would become king and Raj would get more land. The next day, Chancellor tricks Max into bathing in the river, in where he is captured in a lion cage by zoo hunters.

Upon learning of Max's capture and the Chancellor's betrayal, General Glump seeks out Irwin and asks for his help. Using his likeness, Irwin poses as Max and manages to fool the Chancellor. During his ruse, he also repeals all of Max's ludicrous laws, thus winning the hearts of the animal citizens, including Leonette. Irwin himself falls in love with her, but she finds out that Irwin is not really the king and rejects him for his lies. The Chancellor also learns of the deception and advises Raj to attack anyway since Irwin doesn't know how to lead an army. Raj agrees to this, but secretly plans to betray the Chancellor out of distrust.

General Glump manages to save Max from hunter's camp and they both return to find the kingdom under attack by Emperor Raj and his army. The Chancellor runs away after being betrayed and invades Leonette's home where he kidnaps her. The soldiers quickly fall into disarray due to Irwin's ineptitude, but the citizens join the fight to repay his kindness. Upon which, Max realizes how unpopular he was before. Soon enough, Max and Irwin get together and team up to fight back, forcing Raj's army into retreat. Once Raj has been defeated, Irwin rescues Leonette and defeats Chancellor, who runs away for good after being kicked by the angry Leonette.

The next day, Max changes his ways and even offers to share the monarchy with Irwin, but Irwin decides that he wants to marry Leonette, who he has reconciled with. Together they return to the jungle to get his book finished, alongside Ricardo and Daphne, who have also fallen in love.

Voice cast
 
Irene Cara as Leonette
Cam Clarke as Ricardo the beautiful Parrot and Emperor Raj
Townsend Coleman (additional voices)

See also
Golden Films

References

External links 
 

1994 films
1994 animated films
American children's animated adventure films
American children's animated fantasy films
American fantasy adventure films
Animated films about lions
1990s American animated films
1990s fantasy adventure films
Fictional lions
Fictional hyenas
Fictional apes
Golden Films animated films
1990s English-language films